Metodiy Stefanov (born 5 August 2000) is a Bulgarian footballer who currently plays as a midfielder for Ludogorets Razgrad II.

Club career

Ludogorets Razgrad
After spending 2 seasons with the first team of Pirin Blagoevgrad Stefanov signed with Ludogorets Razgrad, joining their second team. He made his debut for the team in a Second League match on 24 February 2019 against Lokomotiv Sofia.

International career
Stefanov was called-up for Bulgaria U19 in October 2018 for the friendlies against Azerbaijan U19. He scored a goal in the second match played on 25 October 2018.

Career statistics

Club

References

External links
 

Living people
2000 births
Sportspeople from Blagoevgrad
Bulgarian footballers
Bulgaria youth international footballers
Association football midfielders
First Professional Football League (Bulgaria) players
PFC Ludogorets Razgrad II players
OFC Pirin Blagoevgrad players